André Daguin (20 September 1935 – 3 December 2019) was a French chef who owned, cooked, and ran the kitchen at  Hôtel de France in Auch, which he inherited from his parents, before selling it to Roland Garreau in 1997.

Biography
Daguin worked as a chef for forty years. He was heralded for his regional cuisine, such as duck breast and a fresh foie gras with 
langoustines, or a white bean ice cream.'

He is the co-author of several books on cooking, such as Le nouveau cuisinier Gascon (1981), and 1 canard 2 Daguin (2010).

Daguin played rugby at lycée d'Auch de Salinis. He attempted to run for office in Auch several times with the Union for French Democracy, but was unsuccessful. His daughter, Ariane, works as a restaurateur in the United States, while his son, Arnaud, is a restaurateur in France.

Daguin served as President of Union des métiers de l'industrie hôtelière (UMIH), which is a union of professional restaurateurs in France. He served on the French Economic, Social and Environmental Council, and was a columnist for Les Grandes Gueules.

References

1935 births
2019 deaths
French chefs